This list of software for protein model error verification is a compilation of bioinformatics software frequently employed to check experimental and theoretical models of protein structures for errors.

Lists of software
Structural bioinformatics software